The men's 1500 metres at the 2018 IAAF World Indoor Championships took place on 3 and 4 March 2018.

Summary
Two disqualifications and three national records highlighted the heats.

In the final, 2012 champion, Abdelaati Iguider jumped out to an early lead, with the American pair of Ben Blankenship and Craig Engels immediately behind him.  The entire field jogged through the first 400 at warm up pace, 1:15.84.  Blankenship found himself in the lead, looking around as if, "where is everybody?"  At 600 metres, in 1:52.48, finally 18 year old Samuel Tefera came forward, the pace quickened slightly.  He was joined by teammate Aman Wote and the pace began to get quicker, though still not 30 per lap pace.  800 metres in 2:23.68.  Iguider came back to Tefera's shoulder, both speeding up to run a 28.49 lap, 1000 metres in 2:52.16.  Blankenship held on to their back, Wote boxing him in on the outside.  A 27.38 lap for 1200 in 3:19.54.  Jake Wightman ran out in lane 3 to run around the crowd into third place as Iguider squeezed into the lead on the inside.  With 300 metres to go, Marcin Lewandowski, known more as an 800 metres runner, was at the back of the pack, but he too moved to the outside and started sprinting past the field, reaching Wightman at the bell.  Wightman held Lewandowski to the outside of the penultimate turn but on the backstretch, he passed and set off after Tefera and Iguider.  A 25.38 lap, 3:44.84 would have won the race most years, but they still had 100 metres to go.  It came down to a final 50 metre sprint on the home stretch.  Tefera passed Iguider and ran away to victory, with Lewandowski in full sprint behind him.  A desperate Iguider began leaning five metres before the finish, but he couldn't hold off Lewandowski speeding past for silver.  For Iguider, it was his second bronze medal in this event, to go along with the complete set of medals he had already collected between 2010 and 2014.

The winning time of 3:58.19 would be a slow mile time in this era.  Tefera had run significantly faster, setting the World Junior Record in the event at 3:36.05, just 36 days earlier.  That was his first experience on an indoor track.

Results

Heats
The heats were started on 3 March at 11:10.

Final

The final was started on March 4 at 16:12.

References

1500 metres
1500 metres at the World Athletics Indoor Championships
2018 in men's athletics